Hieronymus Payer (13 February 1787 in Vienna-Meidling; died 17 August 1845 in the same place) was an Austrian composer and pianist.

Life and career 
Hieronymus (Jérome) Payer was the son of a teacher. As a 10-year-old he earned his living as a backup musician and was then hired as an assistant teacher of his father’s. In 1806 he became a conductor in the so-called Meidlinger Summer Theatre, for which he even wrote some small Singspiels. Later he moved to the Innere Stadt of Vienna and performed in the Redoutensaal and Theater an der Wien successfully. He was active as a teacher, including of Leopoldine Blahetka.

Payer introduced in 1821 in Vienna for the first time the Physharmonica in a public concert. Three years later he became a conductor in Amsterdam (at the Hoogduitse Schouwburg) and in 1825, in Paris. In 1832 he returned to Vienna as conductor for a short time in the Theater in der Josefstadt. As a pianist he had been compared by his contemporaries with Johann Nepomuk Hummel, Ignaz Moscheles and Ferdinand Ries.

Works (selection) 
6 masses and other sacred works, 10 operas and operettas, including;
 Der wilde Jäger, Meidling 1806 or 26. July 1807
 L’arbre creux, Meidling 1808
 Der hohle Baum, Meidling 1810
 Die musikalische Akademie, 1825
 Die Trauer, 1825
 Hochlands Fürsten, 1825 (libretto: Carl Schütz), has also appeared Johann Nestroy
 La croix de feu, 1830
 Instrumental music
 Overtures, concertos, marches, waltzes, piano music, chamber music

Sources 
 August Schmidt: Denksteine 1848, 
 Jürgen Hein: Nestroy in Amsterdam, Nestroyana, 8/3–4, .
 Henk J. Koning: Nestroy in Amsterdam. Zur Rezeption seiner Stücke auf der holländischen Bühne des 19. Jahrhunderts, Nestroyana, 14/3–4, .
 Gerrit Waidelich: Dokumente zu Nestroys Amsterdamer Engagement in Korrespondenzberichten über das dortige Deutsche Theater, Nestroyana, 17/1-2 (1997), .

External links 
 Österreichisches Biographisches Lexikon, S. 373f.
 Porträt im Bezirksmuseum Wien-Meidling
 Payer in Amsterdam 1825 – 1
 Payer in Amsterdam 1825 – 2

1787 births
1845 deaths
Austrian male composers
Austrian composers
Austrian conductors (music)
Male conductors (music)
Austrian classical pianists
Male classical pianists
Musicians from Vienna
19th-century classical pianists
19th-century male musicians